The Petite rivière Sainte-Marguerite (in English: Little Sainte-Marguerite River) crosses the municipalities of Saint-François-de-la-Rivière-du-Sud (MRC of Montmagny Regional County Municipality) and Saint-Raphaël (MRC de Bellechasse Regional County Municipality), in the administrative region of Chaudière-Appalaches, in Quebec, in Canada.

The "Petite rivière Sainte-Marguerite" is a tributary of the north bank of the rivière du Sud (Montmagny) which flows nord-west, then north-east to the south bank of St. Lawrence River.

Geography 
The "Little Sainte-Marguerite river" has its source in a mountainous area in the municipality of Saint-François-de-la-Rivière-du-Sud, located in the Notre Dame Mountains.

  towards the north-west;
  south-west, then north-west;
  towards the south-west, to the confluence of a stream coming from the south-east;
  south-west, up to a forest road;
  towards the southwest, until its confluence.

The "Petite rivière Sainte-Marguerite" empties on the north shore of the rivière du Sud (Montmagny) between two series of falls and downstream of the Saint-Raphaël.

Toponymy 
The toponym "Petite rivière Sainte-Marguerite" was made official on July 10, 1969, at the Commission de toponymie du Québec.

See also 
 List of rivers of Quebec

References 

Rivers of Chaudière-Appalaches
Montmagny Regional County Municipality
Bellechasse Regional County Municipality